Statoil Fuel & Retail was a Norwegian energy retail company, formed by the 2010 separation of the downstream business of Statoil ASA into a separate listed company.

The company had 2,300 fuel retail stations in Scandinavia, Poland, the Baltic countries and Russia as well as significant lubricants and aviation fuel operations. It was listed as a separate company on the Oslo Stock Exchange on October 22, 2010.

On 18 April 2012 it was announced that Alimentation Couche-Tard would buy Statoil Fuel & Retail for US$2.8 billion and it would become a wholly owned indirect subsidiary of Couche-Tard. The deal included the right to use the "Statoil" brand for the stations until 30 September 2019.

In September 2014, the jet fuel business of Statoil Fuel & Retail was sold to BP for an undisclosed amount.

On 22 September 2015 it was announced that the "Statoil" branding would be phased out, and replaced by Circle K as part of a global rebranding scheme involving all Couche Tard-owned retailers.

In 2016, Couche-Tard decided to merge Circle K and Statoil Fuel & Retail into the Circle K brand.

Brands and geographic presence
Statoil Fuel & Retail was presented in eight countries (2010):

References

External links

 
Automotive fuel retailers
Defunct oil companies
Oil companies of Norway
Retail companies of Norway
Alimentation Couche-Tard
Companies based in Oslo
Energy companies established in 2010
Retail companies established in 2010
Retail companies disestablished in 2016
2016 disestablishments in Norway
Defunct energy companies of Norway
Companies formerly listed on the Oslo Stock Exchange
Norwegian brands
Filling stations
2012 mergers and acquisitions
2016 mergers and acquisitions
Norwegian companies established in 2010